Eugene Brave Rock is a Canadian actor and stunt man. Brave Rock started as an actor, before being trained as a stuntman; he later appeared in various minor television roles before landing his first major film role as Chief in Wonder Woman.

Biography 
Brave Rock grew up on the Kainai Nation reserve in Alberta and attended the Plains Indian Cultural Survival School in Calgary, where he landed his first role in a play. He was later trained as a stuntman, and performed for the Buffalo Bill’s Wild West Show in Disneyland Paris. Upon his return to Calgary, Brave Rock worked on several television productions as a stuntman and actor, taking on minor roles in Bury My Heart at Wounded Knee, Heartland, Blackstone, Klondike and Hell on Wheels. When The Revenant began filming in Alberta, Brave Rock and his brother were recruited to train native stuntmen; it was during this time he was contacted by the producers of Wonder Woman, who invited him to audition for a role. Though Brave Rock was not confident of his audition, he was cast in the film a month later.

Filmography

Film

Television

References

External links
 

21st-century Canadian male actors
Kainai Nation people
 Native American male actors
Canadian male film actors
First Nations male actors
Living people
Male actors from Alberta
Year of birth missing (living people)